97BT99 is the fourth compilation album by Buck-Tick, released on March 29, 2000. It contains various material the band released while signed to Mercury Music Entertainment. It reached number thirty-nine on the Oricon chart.

Track listing

Disc One 
 "Heroine" (ヒロイン)
 "Rasenchu -Tapeworm Mix-" (螺旋　虫 -Tapeworm Mix-; Spiral Worm -Tapeworm Mix-)
 "Thantos" (タナトス)
 "Sexy Stream Liner"
 "Heroine -Angel Dust Mix-" (ヒロイン -Angel Dust Mix-)
 "Muchi no Namida" (無知の涙; Tear for Ignorance)
 "Lizard Skin no Shoujo" (リザードスキンの少女; Lizard-Skinned Girl)
 "Rasenchu" (螺旋　虫; Spiral Worm)
 "Chouchou" (蝶蝶; Butterfly)
 "Sasayaki" (囁き; Whisper)
 "Kalavinka" (迦陵頻伽 Kalavinka)
 "My Fuckin' Valentine"
 "Schiz・o Gensou" (Schiz・o幻想; Schiz・o Illusions)
 "Kimi ga Shin... Dara" (キミガシン・・・ダラ; When...You Die)

Disc Two 
 "Sasayaki -Single Mix-" (囁き -Single Mix-; Whisper -Single Mix-)
 "Thanatos -Japanic Pig Mix-" (タナトス -Japanic Pig Mix-)
 "My Fuckin' Valentine -Enemy Mix (Full)-"
 "Schiz・o Gensou -The Spiderman Mix-" (Schiz・o幻想 -The Spiderman Mix-; Schiz・o Illusions -The Spiderman Mix-)
 "Gessekai" (月世界; Lunar World)
 "My Baby Japanese"
 "Muchi no Namida Hot remix #001 for B-T" (無知の涙 HOT remix #001 for B-T; Tear for Ignorance HOT remix #001 for B-T)
 "Bran-New Lover"
 "Down"
 "Asylum Garden"
 "Miu" (ミウ)
 "Paradise" (パラダイス)
 "Bran-New Lover -Custom-"

References 

Buck-Tick albums
2000 compilation albums
Mercury Records compilation albums